The men's middleweight (75 kg/165 lbs) Low-Kick category at the W.A.K.O. World Championships 2007 in Belgrade was the fifth heaviest of the male Low-Kick tournaments, involving nineteen fighters from four continents (Europe, Asia, Africa and South America).  Each of the matches was three rounds of two minutes each and were fought under Low-Kick rules.

Due to there being too few fighters for a tournament designed for thirty-two, thirteen of the fighters received a bye through to the second round.  The tournament gold medalist was Croatian Marko Benzon who defeated France's Bakari Tounkara in the final by unanimous decision.  Kazak Nurlan Nurgaliyev and Serbia's Dragan Micic claimed bronze medals.

Results

Key

See also
List of WAKO Amateur World Championships
List of WAKO Amateur European Championships
List of male kickboxers

References

External links
 WAKO World Association of Kickboxing Organizations Official Site

Kickboxing events at the WAKO World Championships 2007 Belgrade
2007 in kickboxing
Kickboxing in Serbia